Noel Chance (born 18 December 1951) is a retired Irish racehorse trainer who was based at Upper Lambourn, Berkshire.

Chance retired from training in 2013 after a career which began in Ireland and lasted for 38 years. He trained two winners of the Cheltenham Gold Cup with Mr Mulligan in 1997 and Looks Like Trouble in 2000.

References

BBC website profile

Living people
1951 births
Irish racehorse trainers